The Jetstream was a roller coaster located at Riverview Park in Chicago. It was built in 1964 and demolished only three years later in 1967 when the park abruptly went under. The Jetstream, which was built to replace the park's aging Greyhound roller coaster, was not yet paid off when demolished. The ride was shorter than its predecessor, the Greyhound. The ride was not as profitable as some of its more wild cousins, such as The Bobs, and The Comet.

Jetstream was designed by coaster designer John C. Allen and built by Philadelphia Toboggan Coasters.

The ride was rumored to have been reassembled at a park in Rockford, Illinois after the sudden closure of Riverview, but for whatever reason, the deal fell through. The trains, for a short time, were used on Thunder Road at Carowinds, but have since been destroyed.

References

Former roller coasters in Illinois